Sami Clark (19 May 1948 – 20 February 2022) was a Lebanese singer, who had his career peak in the 1980s.

Life and career 
Clark began his music career in the late 1960s, a few years after joining the Faculty of Law at the Jesuit University in Beirut without graduating there.

He won several international prizes throughout his lifetime, such as the Menschen und Meer prize in Austria for his song Mori Mori, which granted him international recognition. His songs are characterized by romanticism and his distinct operatic voice. Besides Arabic (Lebanese) and English, Clark sang in Armenian, French, Italian, and Russian. He was famous for performing the score of popular cartoons in the 1980s, most notably for singing the Arabic theme song of the Japanese anime "Grandizer". Clark was also the head of the union of Lebanese artists. He briefly performed as part of a trio called "The Golden Age" with his fellow Lebanese singers, Prince Al Sagheer and Abdo Munzir. 

He died on February 20, 2022, at the age of 73.

Selective songs

English 
 Mori Mori
 Take me with you
 Amazing Man
 Dog Man
 Dog Man and the Adventures of the Wild West
 Dog Man to the Rescue
 Dog Man Fights Again
 Dog Man: The Final Chapter

Arabic 
 Koumi ta norkos ya sabiyeh (قومي تنرقص يا صبية , "Let's dance young girl")
 Liman toughanni al touyour (لمن تغني الطيور , "For whom the birds sing")
 Ah Ah ala hal Iyyam (آه آه على هالأيام , "Oh, those days!")
 Tami (تامي)
 Grendizer Theme Song
 Treasure Island Theme Song

References

External links 
 
 Sammy Clark: The Lebanese voice behind ‘UFO Robot Grendizer’s’ Arabic theme song

1948 births
2022 deaths
21st-century Lebanese male singers
Lebanese singers
People from Dhour El Choueir